Shirdi Sai of Delaware is a Hindu temple in Newark, Delaware, United States.

The main deity is Sai Baba of Shirdi. Other deities at the temple are Lord Ganesh, Lord Shiva, Lord Dattatreya, Lord Ayappa, Goddess Sarawathi, Lord Venkateshwara, Goddess Sridevi and Bhudevi; Lord Kartikeya (Murugan, Subrahmanya), GoddessValli and Devasena.

The main mission of the temple is to promote and follow the philosophies of Shri Shirdi Sai (also called as “Guru”, “Sai Baba”, “Sai Ma”) who taught a moral code of love, forgiveness, helping others, charity, contentment, inner peace and devotion to God and Guru.  Also to provide a unified place of worship for all followers who reside in our community and the surrounding areas.  

The temple focuses on social, cultural, spiritual, peace, harmony, charity, educational growth and awareness in the community.

See also
 List of Hindu temples in the United States
List of Sai Temples in the United States

References

External links
 
 Yelp
 Yellowpages

Hindu temples in Delaware
Buildings and structures in Newark, Delaware